The Syracuse Orange women's basketball program is an intercollegiate women's basketball team representing Syracuse University.  The program is classified in the NCAA's Division I, and the team competes in the Atlantic Coast Conference. The Orange play their home basketball games at the Carrier Dome in the University Hill neighborhood of Syracuse, New York. The team is coached by Felisha Legette-Jack.

History

Basketball started at Syracuse in 1898, playing against Hamilton Ontario YMCA. Varsity team was fielded in 1971.

Postseason results

NCAA Division I
The Orange have appeared in 12 NCAA Tournaments, with a record of 10-12.

AIAW Division I
The Orange made one appearance in the AIAW National Division I basketball tournament, with a combined record of 0–1.

Year-by-year results

Source:

See also
 Syracuse Orange men's basketball

References

External links
 

 
Basketball teams established in 1971
1971 establishments in New York (state)